Češnjica pri Kropi is a village near Kropa in the Municipality of Radovljica in the Upper Carniola region of Slovenia.

Name
The name of the settlement was changed from Češnjica to Češnjica pri Kropi in 1952.

Church

The church in Češnjica pri Kropi is dedicated to Saint Thomas. It was built in 1696 and renovated in 1763 and 1814. The church is decorated in a simple Baroque style.

References

External links
Češnjica pri Kropi at Geopedia

Populated places in the Municipality of Radovljica